The Sanger Harris department store building was the downtown store of the Sanger Harris department store chain (now part of Macy's). It is listed on the National Register of Historic Places. It is currently the El Centro College at Dallas College.

See also

National Register of Historic Places listings in Dallas County, Texas
List of Dallas Landmarks

References

Italianate architecture in Texas
Romanesque Revival architecture in Texas
Commercial buildings completed in 1884
Commercial buildings on the National Register of Historic Places in Texas
Department stores on the National Register of Historic Places
National Register of Historic Places in Dallas